Andre Ward vs. Edwin Rodriguez was a boxing match for the WBA (Super) and The Ring super middleweight titles. Andre Ward won the match in the twelfth round by a unanimous decision.

References

Boxing matches
2013 in boxing
Boxing in California
Sports in Ontario, California
2013 in sports in California
November 2013 sports events in the United States